John E. Amari (born August 7, 1948) is an American lawyer, politician and judge from Alabama.

Background
Born in Roebuck in Jefferson County, Alabama, he received a B.A. from the University of Montevallo, followed by a J.D. from the Cumberland School of Law at Samford University in Birmingham.

He was elected to terms in both the Alabama House and the Alabama Senate. In 2006, he unsuccessfully sought election to the Alabama Public Service Commission, but he was elected to a seat on the Alabama District 10 Circuit Court in 2008.

He retired as a judge in 2019 and was replaced by Martha Cook.

References

 

1948 births
Living people
Lawyers from Birmingham, Alabama
People from Trussville, Alabama
Democratic Party members of the Alabama House of Representatives
Democratic Party Alabama state senators
Alabama state court judges
Alabama lawyers
Republican Party Alabama state senators
University of Montevallo alumni
Cumberland School of Law alumni
Politicians from Birmingham, Alabama
20th-century American politicians
20th-century American lawyers
21st-century American judges